Vasia is a comune (municipality) in the Province of Imperia in the Italian region Liguria, located about  southwest of Genoa and about  northwest of Imperia.

Vasia borders the following municipalities: Borgomaro, Dolcedo, Imperia, Lucinasco, Pontedassio, and Prelà.

References

External links
 Official website

Cities and towns in Liguria